Stevensons of Uttoxeter was a bus company that operated in Staffordshire from 1926 to 1997.

History
On 11 September 1926, John Stevenson commenced operating a bus service from Uttoxeter to Burton upon Trent. In 1971, the business passed to John's son George, who was shortly joined by his son David. In 1977, the fleet comprised 40 buses.

In 1983, George sold his 50% share of the business to Julian Peddle. On 1 October 1985, Stevensons merged its bus operations with that of East Staffordshire District Council, with Stevenson and Peddle owning 51% and the council 49%. In 1987, Stevensons took a shareholding in Midland Fox including acquiring the Swadlincote depot.

In February 1992, Stevensons acquired a shareholding in Rhondda Buses. This was sold to Stagecoach South Wales in November 1993. 

Also in the early 1990s, Stevensons operated substantial services in the West Midlands, mostly under contract to Centro. These routes were later sold or tendered to West Midlands Travel, leaving service 112, serving Burton upon Trent and Birmingham, as its only route in the West Midlands.

In June 1994, the business was purchased by British Bus who operated it in conjunction with their Midland Red North business which today is part of Arriva Midlands. At the time of the purchase Stevensons owned 270 buses and were the largest independent bus operator in the United Kingdom.

Under Arriva, the Stevensons name was phased out from the end of 1997 and the original Uttoxeter (Spath) garage closed in 2000, then the Swadlincote garage closed in 2007 before the Burton operation was sold to Midland Classic in 2016.

References

External links

Flickr gallery
The Bus gallery

Companies based in Staffordshire
Former bus operators in England
Transport in Staffordshire
1926 establishments in England